Lamar County is the name of several counties in the United States:

 Lamar County, Alabama 
 Lamar County, Georgia
 Lamar County, Mississippi 
 Lamar County, Texas